US Post Office-Hudson Falls is a historic post office building located at Hudson Falls in Washington County, New York.   It was designed and built 1935–1936, and is one of a number of post offices in New York State designed by the Office of the Supervising Architect of the Treasury Department under Louis A. Simon.  The building is in the Colonial Revival style and is a -story, five-bay, steel-frame building clad in red brick.  The interior features a 1937 mural series by George Picken that includes "Scenes and Activities of the Hudson," "Transportation," and "Mail by Airplane."

It was listed on the National Register of Historic Places in 1989.

References

Hudson Falls
Colonial Revival architecture in New York (state)
Government buildings completed in 1936
Buildings and structures in Washington County, New York
Individually listed contributing properties to historic districts on the National Register in New York (state)
Treasury Relief Art Project
National Register of Historic Places in Washington County, New York